American stand up comedian and actor Dave Chappelle has received numerous awards and honors for his iconic work.

He is most notable for his satirical sketch show, Chappelle's Show which lasted from 2003 to 2005. He received his first Emmy Award in 2017 for his guest appearance on Saturday Night Live. In 2018, he received a Grammy Award for his Netflix-produced comedy album The Age of Spin and Deep in the Heart of Texas. Equanimity, another Netflix special, was nominated in 2018 for three Emmys and received the award for Outstanding Variety Special (Pre-Recorded). In 2019, Chappelle was selected to receive the Mark Twain Prize for American Humor, which is presented by the Kennedy Center as America's highest comedy honor. In 2020, Sticks & Stones earned Chappelle his third consecutive Grammy Award for Best Comedy Album.

Major awards

Emmy Awards

Grammy Awards

Screen Actors Guild Awards

Producers Guild of America Award

Miscellaneous awards

Teen Choice Awards

NAACP Image Awards

NAMIC Vision Awards

Black Reel Awards

DVD Exclusive Awards

References 

Lists of awards received by writer
Lists of awards received by American actor
Awards